Writers is an independently-produced web series created by Adam T Cottle, featuring characters created by Cottle, Leah Sperring and David Thompson. It follows the personal lives of a dysfunctional group of friends and writers. It was released on YouTube on CCE Entertainment (now Volplex Pictures) between 2014 and 2017. The first season was briefly broadcast in the UK on the Made Television network in 2015.

Premise
Struggling writers Emmett Shelby and Jess Spencer meet one day during a bout of writer's block, and are reunited a year later through Emmett's twin sister Daisy. Daisy is a successful children's author who shares her home with her illustrator boyfriend, Barney Fields, and their flamboyant landlord Hugh Darvill. Jess and Emmett later move in with Daisy. The group also interact with Jenny Sinclair, Daisy's quirky agent who holds unrequited feelings for Emmett.

Cast 

Leah Sperring as Jessica "Jess" Spencer; Daisy's childhood friend, Emmett's love interest, and an aspiring writer.
David Thompson as Emmett Shelby; Daisy's twin brother and struggling writer.
Isabella Cosh as Daisy Shelby; Emmett's twin sister and a popular children's author.
Jack Stringer as Barney Fields; Daisy's boyfriend and illustrator.
Jordan Cottle as Hugh Darvill; an unsuccessful gay erotic novelist and the group's landlord. Jordan Cottle also directed the season two episode Jenny's Version.
Grace Martinson as Jennifer "Jenny" Sinclair; an excitable and fanciful literary agent who represents Daisy. Jenny also has an unrequited attraction to Emmett.

Production 
The series began as a short film Adam T Cottle directed as a college graduation project, starring David Thompson and Leah Sperring as two unnamed writers struggling with writer's block, which was released on YouTube in June 2014. Production on the series began shortly after. Initially planned as six fifteen-minute episodes, the episodes eventually reached the standard length for broadcast television. A second season launched on 6 February 2016, and concluded with a one-off special released on 22 June 2017. An additional episode, titled Writers: The Final Chapter, was announced with a trailer at the end of the special but was never released.

In the UK, the first season was picked up for national broadcast by the Made Television network. The series debuted on 28 July 2015 with an hour-long premiere made of the original short and the first episode of season one.

Episodes

Season One (2014–15)

Season Two (2016–17)

References

External links
 Official Website
 IMDb Page
 Volplex Pictures YouTube Channel
 MADE Television Website

Television shows about writers
British comedy-drama television shows
2015 web series debuts
YouTube original programming
British comedy web series
British drama web series